Waynesboro Eagle's Nest Airport  is a public-use airport located three miles (5 km) west of the central business district of Waynesboro, in Augusta County, Virginia, United States. It is privately owned by Michael L. Fogle.

Facilities and aircraft 
It is the shortest improved runway in the state of Virginia.

For the 12-month period ending March 31, 2007, the airport had 12,383 aircraft operations, an average of 33 per day: 92% general aviation and 8% air taxi. There are 68 aircraft based at this airport: 88% single-engine, 4% multi-engine and 7% glider.

References

External links 
Eagle's Nest Airport

Airports in Virginia
Buildings and structures in Augusta County, Virginia
Transportation in Augusta County, Virginia